The Harrison Township School District is a comprehensive community public school district serving students in pre-kindergarten through sixth grade from Harrison Township, in Gloucester County, New Jersey, United States.

As of the 2018–19 school year, the district, comprised of two schools, had an enrollment of 1,385 students and 107.6 classroom teachers (on an FTE basis), for a student–teacher ratio of 12.9:1.

The district is classified by the New Jersey Department of Education as being in District Factor Group "GH", the third-highest of eight groupings. District Factor Groups organize districts statewide to allow comparison by common socioeconomic characteristics of the local districts. From lowest socioeconomic status to highest, the categories are A, B, CD, DE, FG, GH, I and J.

Public school students in seventh through twelfth grades attend the schools of the Clearview Regional High School District, which serves students from Harrison Township and Mantua Township. Schools in the district (with 2018–19 enrollment data from the National Center for Education Statistics) are 
Clearview Regional Middle School with 831 students in grades 7-8 and 
Clearview Regional High School with 1,450 students in grades 9-12.

Awards and recognition
For the 2003-04 school year, Pleasant Valley School received the National Blue Ribbon School Award of Excellence from the United States Department of Education, the highest honor that an American school can achieve.

Harrison Township School was recognized by Governor Jim McGreevey in 2003 as one of 25 schools selected statewide for the First Annual Governor's School of Excellence award.

Schools
Schools in the district (with 2018–19 enrollment data from the National Center for Education Statistics) are:
Harrison Township Elementary School with 753 students in grades PreK-3
AnnaLisa Rodano, Principal
Pleasant Valley School with 629 students in grades 4-6
Jennifer Hackett-Slimm, Principal

 Former schools
In the era of de jure educational segregation in the United States the district maintained a separate grade 1-8 school for black children in Mullica Hill. In 1948 it had one teacher.

Administration
Core members of the district's administration are:
Dr. Margaret "Missy" Peretti, Superintendent
Robert Scharlè, Business Administrator / Board Secretary

Board of education
The district's board of education, comprised of nine members, sets policy and oversees the fiscal and educational operation of the district through its administration. As a Type II school district, the board's trustees are elected directly by voters to serve three-year terms of office on a staggered basis, with three seats up for election each year held (since 2012) as part of the November general election. The board appoints a superintendent to oversee the day-to-day operation of the district.

References

External links

School Data for the Harrison Township School District, National Center for Education Statistics
Clearview Regional High School District

Harrison Township, New Jersey
New Jersey District Factor Group GH
School districts in Gloucester County, New Jersey